Dion Kwasi Crabbe (born March 10, 1977) is a sprinter from the British Virgin Islands. He won the 100 metres race at the 2002 Central American and Caribbean Games.

Born in Tortola, Crabbe won the bronze medal over 200 metres at the 1999 Central American and Caribbean Championships. He finished sixth at the 2006 Central American and Caribbean Games.

Achievements

References
 

1977 births
Living people
British Virgin Islands male sprinters
Athletes (track and field) at the 2004 Summer Olympics
Olympic athletes of the British Virgin Islands
Athletes (track and field) at the 2002 Commonwealth Games
Athletes (track and field) at the 2006 Commonwealth Games
Commonwealth Games competitors for the British Virgin Islands
Central American and Caribbean Games gold medalists for the British Virgin Islands
Competitors at the 2002 Central American and Caribbean Games
Central American and Caribbean Games medalists in athletics